Dayton Rugby Grounds (DRG) is 12.5 acres rugby facility in north Dayton adjacent to Shiloh Park.  DRG has two full sized pitches, changing rooms, bathrooms, concessions and a maintenance building

Dayton rugby teams have dreamed of a home for rugby since 1975.  It was discussed and considered for many years and during the “Great Recession” of the late 2000s a movement towards land purchase began as land price dropped in Dayton.  The Property Committee visited over 20 possible sites of the thousands they had looked at on the internet.  One of the sites was Riverdale Baseball Park.  In early January 2011 a presentation by the property committee lead DARC to vote to donate the money to purchase DRG.  
DRG is now the home for rugby in the Dayton area.

See also 
 Rugby union in the United States

References

External links
 Dayton Area Rugby Club website

Sports venues in Dayton, Ohio
Rugby union stadiums in Ohio
2011 establishments in Ohio